The Philippine Educational Theater Association (PETA) is a theatrical association of artists and educators. It is the UNESCO-International Theater Institute Center in the Philippines. It is a non-profit, non-stock, non-governmental, and a registered donee institution. It was awarded the Ramon Magsaysay Award in 2017.

History
On April 7, 1967, Cecile Guidote-Alvarez established the Philippine Educational Theater Association (PETA) who meant the organization to be a vehicle for Philippine Theater to play a role in the development of the country's people and society. Four years later in 1971, PETA was named the UNESCO-International Theater Institute Center in the Philippines. In the same year, coinciding with the 400th foundation anniversary of Manila, PETA organized the first Third World Theater Festival.

Martial law in the Philippines forced founder Guidote-Alvarez to go to a political exile in 1972 but the theatrical organization remains operational. The theatrical works of the organization revolved around the social conditions and political climate during the Martial law era and focused on using the medium of theater as an empowerment for the marginalized sectors.

PETA transferred to a permanent building as its headquarters in 2005, which is named the PETA Theater Center. Since the move, PETA has produced and performed adaptations of classic foreign plays as well as local and children's theatrical productions. They also began to adopt modern pop music.

A multi-function hall on their building’s second floor is dedicated to film director and Filipino national artist Lino Brocka. Before becoming a film director, the young Brocka had worked with PETA as Guidote-Alvarez's assistant, stage actor, and PETA executive director.

For the last 50 years, PETA has remained operational and has continued producing works and training theater practitioners.

See also
Repertory Philippines

References

Theater companies in Metro Manila
1967 establishments in the Philippines
Ramon Magsaysay Award winners